The 37th TVyNovelas Awards for the best of telenovelas and TV series took place on March 10, 2019, and was televised in Mexico on Las Estrellas. Arath de la Torre and Montserrat Oliver hosted the ceremony. The first round of nominees were revealed on January 31, 2019, and the finalists were announced on February 18, 2019.

Amar a muerte won 14 awards, the most for the evening including Best Telenovela of the Year. Among other winners are Mi marido tiene familia and Like, who each won an award.

Summary of awards and nominations

Winners and nominees

Telenovelas 

{| class="wikitable"
|-
!style="background:#EEDD82; width:50%" | Best Telenovela of the Year
!style="background:#EEDD82; width:50%" | Best Original Story or Adaptation
|-
| valign="top" |
Amar a muerte - Carlos Bardasano
La Piloto - Carlos Bardasano
Like - Pedro Damián
Mi marido tiene familia - Juan Osorio
Por amar sin ley - José Alberto Castro
| valign="top" |
Leonardo Padrón - Amar a muerte
Alejandro Pohlenz and Palmira Olguín - Hijas de la luna
María Balmori - Like
Pablo Ferrer, Santiago Pineda, and Martha Jurado - Mi marido tiene familia
Mónica Agudelo, José Alberto Castro, Vanesa Varela, and Fernando Garcilita - Por amar sin ley
|-
! style="background:#EEDD82; width:50%" |Best Actress
! style="background:#EEDD82; width:50%" |Best Actor
|-
| valign="top" |
Angelique Boyer - Amar a muerte
Michelle Renaud - Hijas de la luna
Livia Brito - La Piloto
Susana González - Mi marido tiene familia
Zuria Vega - Mi marido tiene familia 
| valign="top" |
Michel Brown - Amar a muerte
Carlos Ferro - La jefa del campeón
Arath de la Torre - Mi marido tiene familia
Daniel Arenas - Mi marido tiene familia 
David Zepeda - Por amar sin ley
|-
! style="background:#EEDD82; width:50%" | Best Antagonist Actress
! style="background:#EEDD82; width:50%" | Best Antagonist Actor
|-
| valign="top" |
Claudia Martín - Amar a muerte
Mariluz Bermúdez - Hijas de la luna
Ilza Ponko - La Piloto
Bárbara Islas - Mi marido tiene familia
Grettell Valdez - Tenías que ser tú
| valign="top" |
Alejandro Nones - Amar a muerte
Alexis Ayala - Hijas de la luna
Óscar Schwebel - Like
Germán Bracco - Mi marido tiene familia
Julián Gil - Por amar sin ley
|-
! style="background:#EEDD82; width:50%" | Best Leading Actress
! style="background:#EEDD82; width:50%" | Best Leading Actor
|-
| valign="top" |
Raquel Garza - Amar a muerte
Cynthia Klitbo - Hijas de la luna
Isela Vega - Like
Diana Bracho - Mi marido tiene familia 
Carmen Salinas - Mi marido tiene familia
| valign="top" |
Alexis Ayala - Amar a muerte
Omar Fierro - Hijas de la luna
Patricio Castillo - Mi marido tiene familia 
Rafael Inclán - Mi marido tiene familia
Guillermo García Cantú - Por amar sin ley
|-
! style="background:#EEDD82; width:50%" | Best Co-lead Actress
! style="background:#EEDD82; width:50%" | Best Co-lead Actor
|-
| valign="top" |
Macarena Achaga - Amar a muerte
Geraldine Galván - Hijas de la luna
Gabriela Platas - Mi marido tiene familia
Laura Vignatti - Mi marido tiene familia
Altair Jarabo - Por amar sin ley
| valign="top" |
Arturo Barba - Amar a muerte
Mario Morán - Hijas de la luna
Rodrigo Murray - Like
José Pablo Minor - Mi marido tiene familia
José María Torre - Por amar sin ley
|-
! style="background:#EEDD82; width:50%" | Best Young Lead Actress
! style="background:#EEDD82; width:50%" | Best Young Lead Actor
|-
| valign="top" |
Bárbara López - Amar a muerte
Ale Müller - Like
Macarena García - Like
Roberta Damián - Like
Jade Fraser - Mi marido tiene familia
| valign="top" |
Santiago Achaga - Like
Gonzalo Peña - Amar a muerte
Carlos Said - Like
Mauricio Abad - Like
Emilio Osorio - Mi marido tiene familia
|-
! style="background:#EEDD82; width:50%" | Best Direction
! style="background:#EEDD82; width:50%" | Best Direction of the Cameras
|-
| valign="top" |
Alejandro Lozano, Carlos Cock, and Rolando Ocampo - Amar a muerte
Salvador Sánchez and Alejandro Gamboa - Hijas de la luna
Rolando Ocampo - La Piloto
Luis Pardo and Eloy Ganuza - Like
Aurelio Ávila, Francisco Franco, and Juan Pablo Blanco - Mi marido tiene familia
| valign="top" |
Mauricio Manzano and Martha Montufar - Mi marido tiene familia
Gabriel Vazquez Bulman and Jesús Najera - Hijas de la luna
Walter Dohener, Victor Herrera, Luis Rodriguez - La jefa del campeón
Vivian Sánchez Ross and Daniel Ferrer - Like
Bernardo Najera and Mauricio Manzano - Por amar sin ley
|-
! style="background:#EEDD82; width:50%" | Best Musical Theme
! style="background:#EEDD82; width:50%" | Best Cast
|-
| valign="top" |
"Me muero" - Carlos Rivera - Amar a muerte"Tengo" - Timbiriche - Hijas de la luna
"Buena vida" - Daddy Yankee and Natti Natasha - La Piloto
"Este movimiento" - Like - Like
"Tú eres la razón" - Margarita La Diosa de la Cumbia and Los Fontana - Mi marido tiene familia
| valign="top" |Amar a muerteHijas de la luna
La Piloto
Mi marido tiene familia 
Por amar sin ley
|-
|}

 Others 

 Special recognitions 
 Verónica Castro - Recognition for her career' Performers 
The following individuals, listed in order of appearance, presented awards or performed musical numbers.

Presenters

 Performers 

 In Memoriam 

The annual In Memoriam'' segment was introduced by the hosts Arath de la Torre and Montserrat Oliver with Maite Perroni performing "Brillaras".

The segment paid tribute to the following 20 artists:

 Agustín Bernal
 Graciela Bernardo
 Carmela Rey
 Rogelio Guerra
 Arcelia Larrañaga
 Jaime Puga
 Gregorio Casal
 Fela Fábregas
 Alejandro Aguilera Mendieta
 Esteban Mayo
 Santiago Galindo
 María Rubio
 Melquiades Sánchez Orozco
 Lucho Gatica
 Lourdes Deschamps
 Fernando Luján
 Maty Huitrón
 Thelma Tixou
 Fernando Gaitán
 Christian Bach

References 

TVyNovelas Awards
TVyNovelas Awards ceremonies
TVyNovelas Awards
Premios TVyNovelas